The British School in Tokyo (BST; ブリティシュ・スクール・イン東京 Buritishu Sukūru in Tōkyō) is an international school in central Tokyo with over 1,100 students from over 65 nationalities. BST takes students aged 3–18 that have been rated in all eight areas examined by the Independent Schools Inspectorate (ISI). A third of BST students are neither British nor Japanese and there are no entry requirements other than fluency in English. The curriculum follows the National Curriculum.

The school is based on two sites with students aged 3–8 based at the Shibuya campus and students aged 9–18 based at the Showa campus at Showa Women's University.

History 
Established as a trust in 1988 to meet the needs of parents who wished their children to receive a British style education in Tokyo, BST was officially opened by Margaret Thatcher in September 1989 with just 63 students and rapidly expanded.  By 1993 there were 200 students in the entire school.

The existing site could no longer accommodate the growing demand for places and a modern building with improved facilities (the current BST Shibuya site) was opened in Shibuya on 14 May 1998 for over 300 children aged three to eleven. In 2000 the School opened a second site at the municipal Shibuya Elementary School (SES) to accommodate a small number of older students up to age thirteen; the Upper School. In 2003 SES was demolished and the Upper School had to be moved to another municipal facility on the far side of Shibuya Station, the Owada Junior High School. The School continued to attract strong interest, though facilities, particularly for the Upper School, were less than ideal.

To address the issue of inadequate facilities, part of the school was moved in August 2006 to newly renovated accommodation on the campus of the Showa Women's University, located 10 minutes bus ride away to the west of Shibuya station. The original site, BST Shibuya, now accommodates 350 Nursery to Year 3 pupils in refurbished facilities suited to the needs of this age group. The Showa campus underwent construction during the summer of 2017 to accommodate for the rising number of students joining the school, adding new classrooms, libraries, study areas and more. BST Showa offers educational provision from Year 4 to 13 for over 620 students with extra-curriculars, such as sports fixtures and music clubs. Key Stages 4 and 5 include IGCSE, A-Levels, AQA BAC and the International Duke of Edinburgh Award.

Locations 

BST has two campuses: Nursery through Year 3 attend the Shibuya Campus in the Shibuya area of Shibuya Ward, and students in Year 4 through Year 13 attend the Showa Campus in Building 5 of Showa Women's University in Setagaya Ward.

The Showa campus opened on 28 August 2006.

Showa campus facilities

Not owning its own land on Showa campus, BST has had to rent out gyms, fields and halls from Showa Women's University and Temple University, both of which are located on the same campus and are in close proximity of one another. The main indoor sports facilities of BST showa are the Old gym (owned by Showa), the West gym (owned by Temple university), and the New gym (owned by Showa). The main outdoor sports facilities of BST showa are the Astro (big field outside school building), Leo ground (field mainly used by BST), and South Ground (mainly used by BST). Hall/Performance facilities of BST showa are Hitomi hall (seats 1000+), Green hall (slightly smaller, seats 500+), and other halls either on Showa territory or Temple university territory. As of 2021, BST showa used the pool which is located in the basement of a Temple university building, and is also under the west gym (mentioned above). However, before 2019, the specified pool was under construction, meaning the school had to create a contract with the pool of a nearby gym (approximately 500m away), where students would travel to have their swimming lessons and swim team practices.

Curriculum 
Throughout the whole school, BST offers a large range of subjects, including English (Language and Literature), Numeracy, Sciences, ICT, Wellbeing, History, Geography, Art, Drama, Photography, Economics, Business Studies, Music and Physical Education, all of which are offered at IGCSE and A Level. In addition, two Modern Foreign Languages are offered – Japanese from Nursery and French from Year 3. Spanish is also offered for IGCSE and A Level.

Accreditation 
BST is accredited by the Council of British International Schools (COBIS) and has been inspected by ISI. It is also a member of Kanto Plains Schools Association and the Japan Council of International Schools (JCIS).

Sports 

BST offers a range of competitive and recreational sport, with morning or after-school clubs available throughout the school year. Some of these sports include, but are not limited to:
 Volleyball
 Netball
 Futsal
 Football
 Hockey
 Swimming
 Athletics
 Cricket
 Basketball
 Badminton
 Fitness
 Yoga

ECA's (Extra-curricular activities)

ECA's form a crucial part of BST student life and are led by teachers from many year groups. The clubs vary for different age groups/key stages. 
The following are secondary clubs, as of December 2021:

 Strategy games club
 Philosophy discussion club
 Diversity and inclusion club
 Science ambassador club
 Geography club
 DJ and Music production club
 Debating club
 Chess and Shogi club
 Rock 'n' Roll/Live club
 Science fiction club
 Tai Chi club
 STEP maths club
 NHK learning Japanese
 Nrich maths for Y7 and Y8
 Model United Nations club
 Art sustainable fashion workshop

See also

Britons in Japan
Japan–United Kingdom relations
British Embassy, Tokyo
Japanese international schools in the United Kingdom:
 Japanese School in London
 Rikkyo School in England
 Teikyo School United Kingdom
 Defunct: Gyosei International School UK

References

External links

International schools in Tokyo
High schools in Tokyo
Tokyo
Japan–United Kingdom relations
Educational institutions established in 1989
1989 establishments in Japan
Setagaya
Shibuya